Moussa Kemoko Diakité (born 1940) is a Guinean cinematographer and film director.

Life
Moussa Kemoko Diakité was born in Mamou, and studied drama in Germany. He started by making short documentaries, and his 1970 documentary  won second prize at the 1972 Panafrican Film and Television Festival of Ouagadougou. In 1982 Diakité directed a feature film, Naitou, featuring the Guinean national ballet company.

Filmography

Director

Photography

Camera

Producer

References

External links
 

1940 births
Living people
Guinean film directors
Guinean expatriates in Germany
People from Mamou